Doab-e Bilukher (also Romanized as Doāb Bīlūkher; also known as Doāb) is a village in Margown Rural District, Margown District, Boyer-Ahmad County, Kohgiluyeh and Boyer-Ahmad Province, Iran. At the 2006 census, its population was 115, in 21 families.

References 

Populated places in Boyer-Ahmad County